Cover Girl Models is a 1975 exploitation film from New World Pictures about three models who become involved in international espionage.

Plot
Three fashion models travel from Los Angeles to Hong Kong for a shoot. Barbara accidentally comes in possession of some microfilm and is chased by secret service agents. Claire tries to get a role in a film. Mandy tries to make it as a model and falls for their photographer.

Cast
Pat Anderson as Barbara Cooper
Lindsay Bloom as Claire
Tara Strohmeier as Mandy
John Kramer as Mark
Rhonda Leigh Hopkins as Pamela
Mary Woronov as Diane
Vic Diaz as Kulik
Tony Ferrer as Ray Chua
A.C. Castro as rebel leader
Nory Wright as Tracy Marks
Mark Lebeuse as Sam Melson
Ken Metcalfe

Production
The film was one of the last movies New World Pictures made in the Philippines because of rising costs associated with filming there.

See also
 List of American films of 1975

References

External links

American exploitation films
1970s exploitation films
1970s English-language films
Films shot in the Philippines
Films directed by Cirio H. Santiago
1970s American films